La Ronde was a restaurant in Honolulu, Hawaii. Built in 1961 and designed by John Graham, it was the first revolving restaurant in the United States (preceding the "Eye of the Needle" restaurant in Seattle) and the third of its kind (after the Florian Tower and the Cairo Tower) in the world. The restaurant is now closed.

The Building
The restaurant was situated at 1441 Kapi'olani Boulevard in the Ala Moana district at the 23rd floor of the Ala Moana Building adjacent to the shopping mall Ala Moana Complex.

The office building has a total height of 25 floors and  including an observation deck at the top. The rotational speed was 1 rotation per hour.

History
The building was designed by John Graham Jr. of the architectural firm John Graham & Company. The building was completed in 1960 and inaugurated 21 November 1961. At that time, it was the highest building in Honolulu.

Graham later received a patent for the revolving design in 1964 (US patent-nr 3125189).

Later, the restaurant was renamed "Windows of Hawaii" but closed completely in the mid-1990s. The premises were converted to office space, and the floor was welded into place.

There was another revolving restaurant in Hawaii, called Top of Waikiki. It was closed in 2020 due to the pandemic.

References

External links
close-up La Ronde (Flickr)
close-up (Waymarking)
image (Flickr)
image (Star Advertiser)
image (Flickr)
over view image (Flickr)
over view image (Historic Hawai‘i Foundation)
images collection
image (1962, Hawaiian Church Chronicle)

1961 establishments in Hawaii
Buildings and structures in Honolulu
Landmarks in Hawaii
Tourist attractions in Honolulu
Buildings and structures with revolving restaurants
1990s disestablishments in Hawaii
Restaurants established in 1961